Dawning is the fourth studio album by the atmospheric sludge metal band Mouth of the Architect. Recorded at Steve Brooks' own Sound Architect Studio in Detroit, MI, it was released on Translation Loss Records on 25 June 2013. Kevin Schindels' guitar tracks recorded by John Lakes in Dayton, OH.

The album was released on digipack CD, limited edition 500 metallic gold double LP.

Track listing

Personnel
Steve Brooks – vocals, guitar, producer
Kevin Schindel – vocals, guitar
Jason Watkins - vocals, keyboards
Dave Mann - drums
Evan Danielson - bass
Chris Fullam - painting
Carson Slovak - layout

References

Mouth of the Architect albums
2013 albums